Tuckahoe Creek is a  tributary of the Choptank River on Maryland's Eastern Shore. It is sometimes (erroneously) referred to as the Tuckahoe River. Upstream of Hillsboro, it forms the boundary between Caroline County and Queen Anne's County, passing through Tuckahoe State Park and dividing the small towns of Queen Anne and Hillsboro. Downstream of Hillsboro, it forms the boundary between Caroline County and Talbot County, before flowing into the Choptank.

Two miles south of Queen Anne, east of where Tapper's Corner Road ends at Lewistown Road, a creek flows into the Tuckahoe near the most likely location of the birth  of Frederick Douglass.

Details on navigating the creek, sights to be seen, etc. may be found in the Choptank & Tuckahoe RiverGuide.

See also
List of rivers of Maryland

Notes and references

Tributaries of the Chesapeake Bay
Rivers of Maryland
Rivers of Caroline County, Maryland